

Dry Creek is a  stream in the California counties of Sonoma and Mendocino. It is a tributary of the Russian River, with headwaters in Mendocino County.

The Dry Creek Valley AVA is an American Viticultural Area.

Geography

Lake Sonoma and the Warm Springs Dam

The creek flows roughly southeast until reaches Lake Sonoma, which is formed by the Warm Springs Dam. Several other creeks that used to merge with the creek now flow into the lake. Downstream of the dam, the creek continues flowing roughly southeast until its confluence with the Russian River.

Bridges
Dry Creek is spanned by numerous bridges, including:
at Yoakim Bridge Road, a concrete continuous tee beam built in 1956
at Westside Road, a steel truss built in 1934
at Lambert Bridge Road, a steel truss built in 1915
at State Route 128, a prestressed concrete Tee Beam built in 2005

See also
Dry Creek Rancheria
List of watercourses in the San Francisco Bay Area
Sonoma County wine

References

External links

Rivers of Mendocino County, California
Rivers of Sonoma County, California
Rivers of Northern California
Tributaries of the Russian River (California)